Agaju: The Sacred Path of Treasure is a cancelled video game for the Gizmondo video game console. Agaju was due to utilise the Gizmondo's "augmented reality and gyroscopic camera technology" - in which the camera would have been used to form the gaming environment. For example, if a player took a picture of a table, a video game character could then run across the surface of that table on the Gizmondo's screen. Some elements of this were showcased at the E3 2005 expo.

References

Adventure games
Cancelled Gizmondo games